Parsah Su (also Romanized as Parsah Sū; also known as Shāhābād-e Parsah Sū, Porsesu, and Por Sūsū) is a village in Chehel Chay Rural District, in the Central District of Minudasht County, Golestan Province, Iran. At the 2006 census, its population was 970, in 239 families.

References 

Populated places in Minudasht County